Harold and the Purple Crayon is a 1955 children's book by Crockett Johnson. Published by Harper Collins Publishers, it is Johnson's most popular book, and has led to a series of other books, as well as many adaptations.

Plot
The protagonist, Harold, is a curious 4-year-old boy who, with his purple crayon, has the power to create a world of his own simply by drawing it.

Harold wants to go for a walk in the moonlight, but there is no moon, so he draws one. He has nowhere to walk, so he draws a path. He has many adventures looking for his room, and in the end, he draws his own house and bed and goes to sleep.

Book series
Harold and the Purple Crayon (1955)
Harold's Fairy Tale (1956)
Harold's Trip to the Sky (1957)
Harold at the North Pole (1958)
Harold's Circus (1959)
A Picture for Harold's Room (1960)
Harold's ABC (1963)
Harold and His Friends: A Harold and the Purple Crayon Treasury (2003)
Adventures of Harold and His Friends (2005)
Harold's Treasure Hunt (posthumous, 2020)

Adaptations
The original story was adapted by Weston Woods Studios (distribution starting in 1969) and Brandon Films into a seven-minute short film in 1959, directed by David Piel and narrated by Norman Rose. In 1971, Gene Deitch directed an animation of A Picture for Harold's Room, and in 1974 an animation of Harold's Fairy Tale. In 1993, these three animations were packaged with a documentary, and sold as the Harold and the Purple Crayon and Other Harold Stories set.
These stories were featured on the popular CBS children's television show Captain Kangaroo, which ran for 30 years from 1955 to 1984 before moving to PBS for six more.
There have also been theater adaptations.

In the couch gag for The Simpsons episode "The Bob Next Door", Harold is shown drawing the Simpson family living room during the regular title sequence. Homer also asks Harold to draw him a can of Duff Beer after he finishes with the living room.

In 2011, the story was adapted as an interactive book for the iPad by Trilogy Studios.

In 2019 on Jimmy Kimmel Live!, Jimmy Kimmel presented a parody, Donald and the Magic Sharpie.

The book is spoofed in the Robot Chicken episode "Bugs Keith in: I Can't Call Heaven, Doug".

Television series

In 2002, the stories were adapted by Adelaide Productions into a 13-episode television series for HBO narrated by Sharon Stone and featuring Connor Matheus as the voice of Harold. The series won a Daytime Emmy Award for "Main Title Design", and was nominated for an Annie Award and Humanitas Prize. The show was also released on VHS and DVD.

The series focuses on Harold using his purple crayon to explore a new world. Each episode has Harold focusing on life lessons throughout his journeys.

Episodes

Film

In February 2010, it was reported that Columbia Pictures was developing a live-action film adaptation of Harold and the Purple Crayon, to be produced by Will Smith and James Lassiter, and written by Josh Klausner. In December 2016, it was reported that the film would also be written by Dallas Clayton.

On February 1, 2021, it was reported that Zachary Levi would star in the film, though it was not stated what role he would play. It was also announced that David Guion and Michael Handelman replaced Klausner and Clayton as screenwriters, with John Davis producing. While Zooey Deschanel was added in the cast, it was announced that Carlos Saldanha is attached to direct the new film.
The film has set a release date of January 27, 2023. It will also be Saldanha’s first feature film after working on Blue Sky Studios' Ferdinand in 2017, which after the studio went defunct in 2021, he did not work on another film after that.

Broadway musical
On March 11, 2022, a Broadway musical adaptation was announced with songs made by AJR and will focus on an adult version of Harold facing challenges in everyday life without his magical purple crayon.

Legacy
The book inspired programmer Petri Purho to create the computer game Crayon Physics Deluxe. The book has been used frequently in children's and art education lesson plans. Based on a 2007 online poll, the National Education Association listed the book as one of its "Teachers' Top 100 Books for Children". In 2012 it was ranked number 16 among the "Top 100 Picture Books" in a survey published by School Library Journal.

One of the protagonists in Captain Underpants, Harold Hutchins, is named after the protagonist in the book, along with George Beard being named after the protagonist in Curious George.

In the book This Thing Called Life by the author Neal Karlen, Prince's mother Mattie Shaw confirmed that his favourite book as a child was Harold and the Purple Crayon and was the reason for Prince's love of the colour purple. 

In Rob Reiner's 1999 romantic comedy The Story of Us, Kate (Michelle Pfeiffer) says that Harold and the Purple Crayon is one of her favorite books and an allegory for her marriage with Ben (Bruce Willis). She later explains that Ben just wouldn't "share the crayon", and that she feels she has been living in his world rather than one she had helped create.

In Episode 3 of the third season of Legion ("Chapter 22"), Gabrielle Haller reads the book to her infant son, David, who will grow up to be the series' central protagonist.

In season 34, episode 15 of The Simpsons, Bart encourages a group of younger children to draw on the library books, and Ralph does so with a purple crayon, drawing off the page and onto the wall, creating a doorway with stairs which he walks through. In an after-credits scene, his father, Chief Wiggum, is seen talking through the doorway, encouraging him to come out and not draw a boat and sail away on it, as he doesn't know where the river it is on goes.

References

External links

Crockett Johnson Homepage: Books: The Harold Series
The Appeal of 'Harold and the Purple Crayon', NPR - All Things Considered, May 29, 2005
Official website for the television series at HBO Family. Archived from the original on March 18, 2006.

1955 children's books
2000s American animated television series
2000s preschool education television series
2001 American television series debuts
2002 American television series debuts
American children's animated adventure television series
American children's animated fantasy television series
American preschool education television series
Animated preschool education television series
American picture books
Children's books adapted into films
Children's books adapted into television shows
Harper & Brothers books
Television series by Adelaide Productions
Television series by Sony Pictures Television
Child characters in literature
Animated television series about children
HBO original programming